Walter Val Majewski (pronounced my-EFF-skee) (born June 19, 1981) is an American former professional baseball outfielder. He played in Major League Baseball (MLB) for the Baltimore Orioles.

Early life
Majewski grew up in Freehold Township, New Jersey, where he went to Freehold Township High School. He later attended Rutgers University. In 2001, he played collegiate summer baseball with the Falmouth Commodores of the Cape Cod Baseball League and was named a league all-star.

Professional career

Baltimore Orioles
Majewski was the Orioles' third-round draft pick in 2002. He began his career with the Aberdeen IronBirds, but was soon promoted to the Delmarva Shorebirds. He played at four different minor league levels in 2003, finishing the year with the high-A Frederick Keys.

After a successful stint with the Double-A Bowie Baysox, he made his MLB debut for the Orioles on August 20, 2004, but suffered a torn labrum in his left shoulder and was limited to nine MLB games.  Despite this, he was named the Orioles' Minor League Player of the Year for 2004. He spent the entire 2005 season on the disabled list.

The club originally thought that the shoulder would not require surgery, but after it failed to heal on its own, Majewski had surgery on it and was sidelined for the 2005 season. In 2006, played for the Ottawa Lynx. In 2007, Majewski split the season between Double-A Bowie and Triple-A Norfolk, but was released by the Orioles in March 2008.

Newark Bears
On April 23, 2008, Majewski signed with the Newark Bears of the Atlantic League.

Houston Astros
On June 22, 2008, Majewski signed a minor league contract with the Houston Astros and was assigned to Double-A Corpus Christi. In July, he was promoted to the Triple-A Round Rock Express. He became a free agent at the end of the season.

Los Angeles Angels of Anaheim
After starting the 2009 season with the Atlantic League's Camden Riversharks, Majewski signed a minor league contract with the Los Angeles Angels of Anaheim on June 11, finishing the season with the Double-A Arkansas Travelers.

Oakland Athletics
In 2010, Majewski returned to the Atlantic League for the start of the season for the third straight season, this time with the York Revolution. Also for the third straight season, he hooked on with a major league organization partway through the season, signing a minor league contract with the Oakland Athletics on May 27. After finishing the season with the Double-A Midland RockHounds, he became a free agent.

Texas Rangers
After returning to the York Revolution for the first half of the 2011 Atlantic League season, Majewski signed a minor league contract with the Texas Rangers on July 25, 2011, and was assigned to the Triple-A Round Rock Express. Following the completion of the Round Rock season, he requested and was given his release. He returned to the York Revolution which had made the Atlantic League playoffs.

References

External links

1981 births
Living people
Aberdeen IronBirds players
American expatriate baseball players in Canada
American people of Polish descent
Arkansas Travelers players
Baltimore Orioles players
Baseball players from New Jersey
Bowie Baysox players
Camden Riversharks players
Corpus Christi Hooks players
Delmarva Shorebirds players
Falmouth Commodores players
Frederick Keys players
Freehold Township High School alumni
Frisco RoughRiders players
Gulf Coast Orioles players
Major League Baseball outfielders
Midland RockHounds players
Newark Bears players
Norfolk Tides players
Ottawa Lynx players
People from Freehold Township, New Jersey
Peoria Javelinas players
Round Rock Express players
Rutgers Scarlet Knights baseball players
Sportspeople from Monmouth County, New Jersey
Sportspeople from New Brunswick, New Jersey
York Revolution players